The FIL European Luge Championships 1980 took place in Olang, Italy for the second time after previously hosting the event in 1975. It also marked the last time the championships would be hosted in consecutive years, a tradition started in 1970. Beginning at these championships, the event would be hosted in even-numbered years, a tradition that continued until 2012.

Men's singles

The Italians sweep the medals in this event after the East Germans did it the previous year.

Women's singles

Men's doubles

Medal table

References
Men's doubles European champions
Men's singles European champions
Women's singles European champions

FIL European Luge Championships
1980 in luge
Luge in Italy
1980 in Italian sport